West Khasi Hills is an administrative district in the state of Meghalaya in India.

History 
The West Khasi Hills district was carved out of the Khasi Hills district, which was divided into West and East Khasi Hills districts on 28 October 1976.

Geography
The district headquarters is located at Nongstoin. The district occupies an area of 5247 km2.

Divisions

Administrative divisions
West Khasi Hills district is divided into four blocks:

Demographics
According to the 2011 census West Khasi Hills district has a population of 383,461, roughly equal to the nation of Maldives. This gives it a ranking of 562th in India (out of a total of 640). Its population growth rate over the decade 2001-2011 was 30.25%. West Khasi Hills has a sex ratio of 980 females for every 1000 males, and a literacy rate of 77.87%.

The district is predominantly inhabited by Khasi tribe. There is a significance presence of Garo Tribe in the Mawshynrut C n RD Block of West Khasi Hills District.

Culture
Khasi society has greatly been transformed by many factors which have arisen in recent times. Adoption of the Western style of life, especially among the literate and educated, have been quite rapid although the matrilineal laws of inheritance and succession and the other cultural traits are still retained.

Places of interest
 Langshiang Falls, third-highest waterfalls in India
 Mawthadraishan Peak, second highest peak in Meghalaya
 Nongkhnum River Island, Langshiang Falls, Weinia Falls, Thums Falls
 Umyiap Paddy Field, longest paddy field in northeast India
 Ranikor
 Kyllang Rock
 Rambrai
 Langpih, a village which is the subject of a territorial dispute with neighbouring Kamrup District, Assam

References

External links
 West Khasi Hills website
 Khasi Hills Autonomous District Council website
 West Khasi Hills District website

 
Districts of Meghalaya
1976 establishments in Meghalaya
Autonomous regions of India